Barry H. Streeter (born ) is an American former college football coach. 

Streeter grew up in Millville, New Jersey, and played football as a defensive back at Millville High School, graduating in 1967. He then attended Lebanon Valley College in Annville Township, Lebanon County, Pennsylvania, where he played as a fullback and tight end on the football team and on defense for the lacrosse team. He graduated in 1971. He received a master's degree from the University of Delaware in 1975.

In August 1975, Streeter was hired by Gettysburg College as an assistant football coach, head track coach, and an instructor in the physical education department. He became Gettysburg's head football coach in February 1978. He remained as the head coach for 39 years through the 2017 season, compiling a 196–193–5 record.

Head coaching record

Football

References

Year of birth missing (living people)
1940s births
Living people
American football fullbacks
American football tight ends
Delaware Fightin' Blue Hens football coaches
Gettysburg Bullets football coaches
Lebanon Valley Flying Dutchmen football players
College men's lacrosse players in the United States
College track and field coaches in the United States
High school football coaches in Pennsylvania
Millville Senior High School alumni
University of Delaware alumni
People from Millville, New Jersey
Coaches of American football from New Jersey
Players of American football from New Jersey
Lacrosse players from New Jersey